Liesl Fischer is a retired slalom canoeist who competed for West Germany in the early 1950s. She won a silver medal in the folding K-1 team event at the 1951 ICF Canoe Slalom World Championships in Steyr.

References

West German female canoeists
Possibly living people
Year of birth missing
Medalists at the ICF Canoe Slalom World Championships